HMS Sea Rider was an 8-gun flyboat of the Royal Navy, captured in 1665, commissioned into the navy, and sold in 1668.

References
 

Ships of the Royal Navy